Theta Pi Sigma, formerly known as Delta Lambda Psi, was started by Marc Garcia  
in 2005 at UC Santa Cruz. There was a lawsuit with Delta Lambda Phi over the use of the initials DLP that resulted in a rename to Theta Pi Sigma. In 2015, the Alpha chapter of Theta Pi Sigma voted to stop using the misleading term frarority due to the gender binary connotations of the term. Theta Pi Sigma is the world's first regional queer-focused, gender-neutral Greek organization on the verge of becoming national with international aspirations.

Mission

The purpose and objective of Theta Pi Sigma is to strengthen Greek life at the University of California, Santa Cruz by providing a vehicle for positive leadership, change, and growth in the queer, transsexual, transgender, questioning, pansexual, lesbian, intersex, gender-queer, gay, bisexual, asexual and ally communities. It is their intention to provide further opportunity to obtain a well-rounded educational experience by offering leadership skills and the exposure needed to succeed financially, academically, socially, and culturally.

Alpha chapter - University of California, Santa Cruz
The first chapter of Theta Pi Sigma was founded by Marc Garcia in 2005 at the University of California, Santa Cruz.

Beta chapter - Northeastern Illinois University
The second chapter of Theta Pi Sigma was founded in 2012 at the Northeastern Illinois University.

Gamma chapter - University of Oregon
The third chapter of Theta Pi Sigma was founded at the University of Oregon.

Epsilon chapter - University of Maryland
The fourth chapter of Theta Pi Sigma was founded in the fall of 2013 at the University of Maryland, College Park.

Zeta chapter - University of Colorado
The fifth chapter of Theta Pi Sigma was founded by Jackson Reinagel in the spring of 2018 University of Colorado, Boulder

Eta chapter - Case Western Reserve University 
The sixth official chapter of Theta Pi Sigma.  Founded in the Spring of 2018 at Case Western Reserve University in Cleveland, Ohio.

References

External links
 
 
 
 

LGBT youth organizations based in the United States
Fraternities and sororities in the United States
University of California, Santa Cruz
LGBT fraternities and sororities
Student organizations established in 2005
2005 establishments in California
LGBT in California